Henry John House (15 July 1919 – 20 November 2006) was an  Australian rules footballer who played with St Kilda in the Victorian Football League (VFL). Harry House has four children and several  grand-children and great-grand-children.

Notes

External links 

1919 births
2006 deaths
Australian rules footballers from South Australia
St Kilda Football Club players
Sturt Football Club players
West Adelaide Football Club players